Belo Vale is a municipality in the state of Minas Gerais, Brazil. It is located 82 km south from Belo Horizonte, the state capital.  The population was 7,719 inhabitants in 2020.

In 2014, a story about the village of Noiva do Cordeiro, situated within Belo Vale, was published by tabloids around the world. Among other things, these reports said that the population of Noiva do Cordeiro was entirely made up of single women, but this has been dismissed as a hoax by BBC Brazil.

References 

Municipalities in Minas Gerais